The National Action Movement can refer to:

 The National Action Movement (Portugal)
 The National Action Movement (Venezuela)